Baqen may refer to:

Baqên County, county in Tibet
Baqên Town, town in Tibet